Sarangesa thecla, also known as the common elfin, is a species of butterfly in the family Hesperiidae. It is found in Guinea, Sierra Leone, Liberia, Ivory Coast, Ghana, Togo, Nigeria, Cameroon, Gabon, the Republic of the Congo, the Central African Republic, the Democratic Republic of the Congo, Uganda, Kenya and Tanzania. The habitat consists of dry semi-deciduous forests.

Adults of both sexes are attracted to flowers and males are also attracted to bird droppings.

Subspecies
Sarangesa thecla thecla - western Guinea, Sierra Leone, Liberia, Ivory Coast, Ghana, Togo, Nigeria, Cameroon, Gabon, Congo, Central African Republic, Democratic Republic of Congo
Sarangesa thecla mabira Evans, 1956 - eastern Democratic Republic of Congo, Uganda, western Kenya, north-western Tanzania

References

Butterflies described in 1879
Celaenorrhinini
Butterflies of Africa